Xibo may refer to:

Xibo people, Tungusic people in Asia
Xibo language, language of Xibo people
King Wen of Zhou (1152 – 1056 BC), or Xibo (western leader), king of the Zhou dynasty
Western Bo (Xibo), early Shang capital, identified by some scholars with Yanshi Shang city

See also
Zibo